Steven T. Walther (born July 18, 1943) is an American attorney who served as a commissioner of the Federal Election Commission. Walther also served as chair of the FEC in 2009 and 2017.

Early life and education 
Walther was born in Reno, Nevada. He earned a Bachelor of Arts degree in Russian from the University of Notre Dame in 1965 and a Juris Doctor from the UC Berkeley School of Law in 1968.

Career 
Walther is a former president of the State Bar of Nevada, the Western States Bar Conference, and the National Caucus of State Bar Associations. He is a past chair of the Fellows of the American Bar Foundation, the legal research arm of the ABA. From 1971 until his FEC appointment, Walther served as a member of the Nevada State Advisory Committee to the United States Commission on Civil Rights.

Prior to joining the FEC, Walther practiced law in the Reno, Nevada law firm of Walther, Key, Maupin, Oats, Cox & LeGoy, now known as Maupin, Cox & LeGoy which he co-founded in 1972.

During his legal career, Walther has been active in professional legal and judicial organizations and activities, as well as numerous civic activities. He is a former member of the Board of Governors of the American Bar Association and currently serves as co-chair of the ABA Center for Human Rights. He has been active in ABA initiatives focusing on international relations, human rights and the rule of law. He was appointed by the ABA President to serve as the ABA Representative to the United Nations. He served on the Executive Board of the ABA Central European and Eurasian Law Initiative (CEELI), which oversees the ABA's democracy building programs in over 21 countries–programs which promote development of fair and open election laws. He has been a member of the board of trustees and lecturer for the National Judicial College, both in the United States and in Russia. Walther has lectured extensively, both domestically and internationally (principally in Russia), on rule of law, human rights, litigation and international law issues. He is a member of the American Law Institute and the International Bar Association.

Federal Election Commission 
He was first sworn in as a commissioner of the Federal Election Commission on January 10, 2006, as a recess appointee. Although his name was placed before the United States Senate for confirmation in June, 2007, his recess term expired on December 31, 2007, before the Senate acted. On June 24, 2008, he was confirmed unanimously by the Senate and sworn in on June 27 as a commissioner, to resume the balance of his statutory term.

In January 2022, Dara Lindenbaum was nominated by President Joe Biden to succeed Walther as a commissioner of the FEC. She was confirmed by the Senate on May 24, 2022 and sworn in on August 2, 2022.

References

1943 births
Living people
Members of the Federal Election Commission
Recess appointments during the George W. Bush administration
UC Berkeley School of Law alumni
Notre Dame College of Arts and Letters alumni
George W. Bush administration personnel
Obama administration personnel
Trump administration personnel
Biden administration personnel